Domikan is a rural locality (a station) in Arkharinsky District, Amur Oblast, Russia. Population: 59 as of 2018.

Geography 
The station is located near the left bank of the Domikan River, 47 km north of Arkhara (the district's administrative centre) by road. Novodomikan is the nearest rural locality.

References

Rural localities in Arkharinsky District